The Apsheron Sill, Absheron Sill, Apsheron Ridge or Apsheron Threshold is a major northwest–southeast trending bathymetric high that runs for about 250 km across the whole of the Caspian Sea from Baku in Azerbaijan to the Cheleken Peninsula in Turkmenistan. The sill separates the central and southern parts of the  Caspian Sea. It is interpreted to be the surface expression of a northeast-dipping subduction zone along which oceanic crust of the South Caspian Basin is being subducted beneath the Central Caspian as part of the complex zone of continental collision between the Arabian Plate and the Eurasian Plate.

References

Caspian Sea
Geology of Azerbaijan
Geology of Turkmenistan